A general election was held on Tuesday, November 8, 2022, to elect candidates throughout Florida, as part of the 2022 midterm elections. The results of the elections showed strong Republican Party outcomes as nearly every Republican candidate won in a landslide. As a result, Republicans now control every statewide office in the state for the first time since Reconstruction. Political analysts believe the results may be an indication that the state has transitioned from being a swing state into a reliably Republican red state.

United States House of Representatives 

All of Florida's 28 house seats were up in the 2022 elections. Republicans, who had already held a majority with 16 seats, expanded their majority by 4 seats by defeating the incumbent Democrats in Florida's 4th, 7th, 13th, and 15th congressional districts; due to this, Florida Democrats were downgraded from 11 seats to 8 seats.

United States Senate 

Incumbent Republican senator Marco Rubio won a third term to the senate, defeating the Democratic nominee Val Demings.

Governor of Florida 

Incumbent Republican governor Ron DeSantis was challenged for reelection by Democrat Charlie Crist, who previously served as governor from 2007 to 2011 as a Republican but switched parties in 2012. DeSantis won the election in a landslide victory by gaining 1,507,897 more votes over Crist.

Attorney General 

Incumbent Republican attorney general Ashley Moody ran for reelection, being challenged by Democrat Aramis Ayala, a former state attorney. Moody defeated Ayala in the general election by a 20-point margin.

Chief Financial Officer 

Incumbent Republican officer Jimmy Patronis was challenged for reelection by Democrat Adam Hattersley. Patronis defeated Hattersley in the general election.

Commissioner of Agriculture 

Incumbent Democratic commissioner Nikki Fried decided not to run for reelection and instead ran for governor but failed to win the nomination. The Democratic Party nominated Naomi Blemur to run in the 2022 election for commissioner, but Blemur was defeated in the general election Republican Wilton Simpson.

Florida House of Representatives 

All 120 seats in the Florida House of Representatives were up for election in 2022. Republicans expanded their majority from 78 to 85 seats, giving them a supermajority in the House.

Florida Senate 

All 40 seats in the Florida Senate were up for election in 2022. Republicans expanded their majority from 24 to 28 seats, giving them a supermajority in the Senate.

Florida Supreme Court 
Incumbent Supreme Court Justices Charles T. Canady, John D. Couriel, Jamie Grosshans, Jorge Labarga, and Ricky Polston were all up for a retention vote in 2022. All of the Justices were retained and will continue to be on the Florida Supreme Court for six more years.

References 

 
Florida